Sex express coffee is a 2010  Mexican thriller film directed by Óscar González.

Cast
 Fernando Consagra
 Ricardo Bonno
 Mateo Lynch
 Plutarco Haza
 Diego de Erice
 María de la Fuente

References

External links
 

2010 films
2010 thriller films
2010s Spanish-language films
Mexican thriller films
Films set in Mexico
Films shot in Mexico
2010s Mexican films